"Goodbye" is a song recorded by French DJ and producer Feder featuring the vocals of French singer Anne-Lyse Blanc. It first became a chart hit in Turkey, Russia, Ukraine and Romania before it started gaining chart success in France too. In spring 2015, the song was released in other European countries and became a top 10 hit in Belgium, Switzerland and Germany.

Music video
A music video to accompany the release of "Goodbye" was first released onto YouTube on 27 February 2015 at a total length of three minutes and twenty-four seconds.

Track listing

Chart performance

Weekly charts

Year-end charts

Certifications

Release history

References

2015 singles
2015 songs
Warner Music Group singles
Number-one singles in Hungary
SNEP Top Singles number-one singles
Number-one singles in Switzerland